This is a list of United States schools of music and colleges and universities with music schools.

Alabama 
 The University of Alabama School of Music

California 
 California College of Music
 California Institute of the Arts
 California State University, Chico
 California State University, Long Beach Bob Cole Conservatory of Music
 California State University, Northridge
 California State University, Sacramento
 California State University, Stanislaus
 Colburn School
 Expressions COLLEGE OF DIGITAL Arts
 Los Angeles Film School, Hollywood, L.A., California
 Musicians Institute Contemporary, Hollywood
 San Francisco Conservatory of Music
 University of California, Berkeley
 University of California, Davis
 University of California, Irvine
 University of California, Los Angeles Herb Alpert School of Music
 University of California, Riverside
 University of California, Santa Barbara
 University of California, Santa Cruz
 University of California, San Diego
 University of the Pacific Conservatory of Music
 University of Redlands School of Music
 University of Southern California Thornton School of Music

Colorado 
 Colorado State University
 University of Colorado Boulder College of Music
 University of Northern Colorado School of Music

Connecticut 
 Hartt School of Music
 Yale University
 University of Connecticut, Storrs
 Western Connecticut State University

District of Columbia 
 Catholic University's Benjamin T. Rome School of Music

Florida 
 Florida A&M (FAMU)
 Florida Atlantic University
 Florida State University College of Music
 Full Sail University
 Palm Beach Atlantic University
 Palm Beach State College
 Rollins College
 Stetson University
 University of Miami Frost School of Music
 University of Florida
 University of Central Florida
 University of North Florida
 University of South Florida
 University of Tampa

Georgia 
 Columbus State University Schwob School of Music
 Georgia Institute of Technology School of Music
 Georgia State University
 Mercer University Townsend School of Music
 The University of Georgia Hodgson School of Music
 Georgia Southern University Department of Music
University of West Georgia Department of Music

Idaho 
 Idaho State University
 University of Idaho

Illinois 
 Chicago College of Performing Arts of Roosevelt University
 Columbia College Chicago Music Department
 DePaul University
 Illinois State University
 Northeastern Illinois University
 Northern Illinois University
 Northwestern University Bienen School of Music
Olivet Nazarene University
 Southern Illinois University Carbondale
 Southern Illinois University Edwardsville
 University of Illinois at Chicago
 University of Illinois School of Music (Urbana, IL)
 Wheaton College Conservatory of Music
 North Park University
 VanderCook College of Music

Indiana 
 Ball State University
 Butler University
 DePauw University
 Indiana University Jacobs School of Music
 The Indiana College of Music

Iowa 
 Iowa State University
 University of Iowa School of Music
 University of Northern Iowa School of Music

Kansas 
 Kansas State University
 University of Kansas
 Wichita State University

Kentucky 
 Campbellsville University
 University of Kentucky
 University of Louisville
 Western Kentucky University

Louisiana 
Louisiana Tech University
LSU
 Northwestern State University
ULL

Maine 
 University of Maine
 University of Southern Maine School of Music

Maryland 
 Peabody Conservatory of Johns Hopkins University
 University of Maryland School of Music

Massachusetts 
 Berklee College of Music
 Boston Conservatory at Berklee
 Boston University
 Longy School of Music
 New England Conservatory of Music
 University Of Massachusetts Amherst

Michigan 
 University of Michigan School of Music, Theatre & Dance
 Michigan State University College of Music
 Grand Valley State University Department of Music and Dance
 Western Michigan University
 Eastern Michigan University
 Central Michigan University

Minnesota 
 McNally Smith College of Music
 University of Minnesota-Twin Cities
 University of Minnesota-Duluth
 St. Cloud State University

Mississippi 
 University of Southern Mississippi
 University of Mississippi

Missouri 
 University of Missouri-Kansas City
 University of Missouri School of Music

Nebraska 
 University of Nebraska - Lincoln School of music

Nevada 
 University of Nevada, Las Vegas School of Music

New Hampshire 
 Chosen Vale Center for Advanced Musical Studies

New Jersey 
 Kean University
 Mason Gross School of the Arts of Rutgers University
 John J. Cali School of Music at Montclair State University
 New Jersey City University
 Rowan University
 The College of New Jersey
 Westminster Choir College of Rider University
 William Paterson University

New York 
 Adelphi University
 Bard College Conservatory of Music
 Brooklyn College Conservatory of Music
 Crane School of Music
Aaron Copland School of Music, Queens College, City University of New York
 Eastman School of Music
 Five Towns College
 Ithaca College School of Music
 Juilliard School
 Manhattan School of Music
 Mannes College of Music
 Marist College
 New York University, Steinhardt School
 New York University, Clive Davis Institute of Recorded Music
 Roberts Wesleyan College
 Syracuse University Setnor School of Music
 The New School for Jazz and Contemporary Music
 City College of New York
 Purchase Conservatory of Music
 Hunter College
 Stony Brook University
 AMDA- American Music Drama Academy
 SUNY Fredonia, Fredonia School of Music

North Carolina 
 Appalachian State University (Mariam Cannon Hayes School of Music)
 Ambassador Baptist College
 Brevard College
 East Carolina University
 High Point University
 University of North Carolina at Greensboro (UNCG College of Visual and Performing Arts)
 University of North Carolina School of the Arts

North Dakota 
 North Dakota State University

Ohio 
 Baldwin-Wallace Conservatory of Music
 Bowling Green State University, College of Musical Arts
 Capital University
 Cleveland Institute of Music
 Cleveland State University
 Kent State University
 Oberlin Conservatory
 Ohio State University
 Ohio University
 The University of Akron
 University of Cincinnati College-Conservatory of Music
 Wright State University
 Youngstown State University

Oklahoma 
 East Central University
 Oklahoma City University
 University of Oklahoma
 University of Central Oklahoma

Oregon 
 University of Oregon
 Portland State University

Pennsylvania 
 Carnegie Mellon School of Music
 Curtis Institute of Music
 Duquesne University
 Gettysburg College
 Millersville University School of Music
 Temple University
 The Pennsylvania State University
 Lebanon Valley College
 University of the Arts
 Indiana University of Pennsylvania
 West Chester University of Pennsylvania

Puerto Rico 
 Conservatory of Music of Puerto Rico
 University of Puerto Rico - Department of Music
 Interamerican University of Puerto Rico - Department of Music

South Carolina 
 Converse College
 University of South Carolina
 Furman University Department of Music
 Bob Jones University Department of Music

Tennessee 
 Austin Peay State University
 Belmont University
 Crown College of the Bible
 Middle Tennessee State University
 Tennessee Technological University
 University of Memphis
 University of Tennessee, Knoxville
 University of Tennessee, Martin
 Blair School of Music, Vanderbilt University
 Lee University

Texas 
 Houston Christian University
 Midwestern State University
 Rice University (Shepherd School of Music)
 Sam Houston State University
 Southern Methodist University
 Stephen F. Austin State University
 Texas Christian University
 Texas Lutheran University
 Texas Tech University (School of Music)
 University of Houston (Moores School of Music)
 University of North Texas College of Music
 University of Texas (Sarah and Ernest Butler School of Music)

Utah 
 Brigham Young University School of Music
 University of Utah
 Utah State University

Virginia 
 George Mason University
 James Madison University
 Liberty University
 Virginia Commonwealth University
 Shenandoah Conservatory
 Christopher Newport University
 Longwood University
 Virginia Polytechnic Institute and State University
 Sweet Briar College

Washington 
Cornish College of the Arts
University of Washington
Northwest University
Central Washington University

West Virginia 
 West Virginia University
 West Virginia State University
Shepherd University
 Marshall University

Wisconsin 
 Lawrence Conservatory of Music, Lawrence University
 University of Wisconsin–Madison
 University of Wisconsin–Milwaukee

References